Da Khop Shop is the only studio album by American rapper Mr. Short Khop. It was released on March 20, 2001, via TVT Records. Recording sessions took place at Cherokee Studios. It features guest appearances from Ice Cube, Kokane, Kurupt, Mack 10, WC and Shaquille O'Neal among others. The album peaked at No. 154 on the Billboard 200. The single "Dollaz, Drank & Dank" reached No. 2 on Billboards Hot Rap Singles chart.

 Track listing Notes'
  signifies a co-producer

Charts

References

External links

G-funk albums
2001 debut albums
TVT Records albums
Albums produced by N.O. Joe
Albums produced by Battlecat (producer)